{| border=1 align="right" cellpadding=4 cellspacing=0 width=300 style="margin: 0 0 1em 1em; background: #f9f9f9; border: 1px #aaaaaa solid; border-collapse: collapse; font-size: 80%;"
|+ style="font-size: larger;"|Sheffield Volleyball Club
|-
|align="center" colspan=2|

|-
|Club Name|| Sheffield Volleyball Club
|-
|Founded|| 1989
|-
|Home Venue|| All Saints Sports Centre  Sheffield, United Kingdom.
|-
|Head coach||  Keith Trenam
|-
|Assistant Coaches
| Keith Trenam
 Kevin O'Malley

 David Roberts

 Matt Bianco
|-
|National League
Teams
|  National Volleyball League   Men's Super 8s
 Men's Division 1

 Women's Division 1
|-
|Honours 2008/09|| League winners  National KO Cup Winners
|-
|Team Colours|| Blue, red.
|-
|Website||www.sheffieldvc.org.uk
|}Sheffield Volleyball Club''' was founded in 1989 and in its short history has already had an illustrious past. Starting as a recreational volleyball side it quickly established itself as one of the major volleyball clubs in the country.  Currently, the club runs multiple other teams alongside their Men's and Women's performance teams. Sheffield Volleyball Club also offer opportunities for junior players.

Men's 1st team
The men's 1st team are one of the most consistently successful teams in recent history in English Volleyball. The team is largely made up of students based at the performance programme of Sheffield Hallam University and relatively local talent. The team has always had a history of developing players from the university level and preparing them for potentially embarking on a professional career as a volleyball player overseas.

Roster 2019/20

Former notable players

References

External links
 www.sheffieldvc.org.uk
 www.fivb.org
 www.volleyballengland.org
 www.britishvolleyball.org

English volleyball clubs
Sport in Sheffield
Volleyball
University and college sports clubs in England